Amanita orientifulva, also known as the Asian orange-brown ringless amanita, is a species of agaric fungus found at altitudes ranging from  in south-western China. It is associated with trees, especially Abies, Quercus, Salix, and occasionally Castanopsis. It fruits singly or scattered from June to September.

Gills on the cap underside are free from attachment to the stipe, crowded closely together, and white to cream in colour with brownish edges. The fruit body has a sac-like volva and lacks a ring on the stipe. The overall colour of the fruit body is brownish with a yellowish to orange cap centre. Its spores are spherical or nearly so, measuring 10–14 by 9.5–13 µm. Names for its similarity to the widespread Amanita fulva (a species with which it was previously confused), it can be distinguished from A. fulva by microscopic features of the volva.

See also
List of Amanita species''

References

orientufulva
Fungi of China
Fungi described in 2004
Taxa named by Franz Oberwinkler